John Norman Doig (24 July 1910 – 29 July 2001) was an Australian rules footballer who played for East Fremantle in the West Australian National Football League (WANFL) during the 1930s. He also had a brief stint with Essendon in the Victorian Football League (VFL).

Doig was from a famous footballing family, with his first cousins George Doig and Ron Doig, amongst others, playing league football. His brothers Bill and Edgar also represented East Fremantle in the WANFL. He made a total of 138 senior appearances for East Fremantle, with Doig's two games at Essendon coming when he was in Melbourne on war service.

References

Holmesby, Russell and Main, Jim (2007). The Encyclopedia of AFL Footballers. 7th ed. Melbourne: Bas Publishing.

1910 births
2001 deaths
East Fremantle Football Club players
Essendon Football Club players
Norman
Australian people of Scottish descent
Australian rules footballers from Perth, Western Australia